Pseudochromis luteus is a species of ray-finned fish from the Western Pacific Ocean, which is a member of the family Pseudochromidae.

References

luteus
Fish described in 1943